Herman Joseph Fuetsch (July 6, 1918 – September 29, 2010) was an American professional basketball player.

A 6'0" guard, Fuetsch was a member of the 1947–48 Baltimore Bullets team that won the 1948 Basketball Association of America championship. He averaged 2.6 points per game in his BAA career.

BAA career statistics

Regular season

Playoffs

External links

Obituary

1918 births
2010 deaths
American men's basketball players
Baltimore Bullets (1944–1954) players
Basketball players from San Francisco
Cleveland Allmen Transfers players
Guards (basketball)